The 2012 Gosport Council election was held on 3 May 2012 to elect members of the Gosport Council in England. This was the same day as other 2012 United Kingdom local elections. The Conservatives gained three seats from the Liberal Democrats, whilst Labour gained one seat each from the Conservatives and Liberal Democrats. Both Labour and the Conservatives saw an increased vote share, whilst the Liberal Democrats' vote share fell.

After the election the composition of the council was:

 Conservative: 24
 Labour: 5
 Liberal Democrats: 5

Election Result

Ward Results

Alverstoke

Anglesey

Bridgemary North

Bridgemary South

Brockhurst

Christchurch

Elson

Forton

Grange

Hardway

Lee East

Lee West

Leesland

Peel Common

Privett

Rowner and Holbrook

Town

References

2012 English local elections
2012
2010s in Hampshire